In music, Op. 145 stands for Opus number 145. Compositions that are assigned this number include:

 Castelnuovo-Tedesco – Fantasia
 Reger – Sieben Stücke, Op. 145
 Ries – Three Flute Quartets
 Schumann – Romanzen und Balladen, Vol. III